Congjiang County is a county in Qiandongnan Miao and Dong Autonomous Prefecture, Guizhou, China. It is divided by the Duliu River, the upper reaches of the Liu River, and borders Guangxi to the south.

It is an important transit point as the first county inside Guizhou on China National Highway 321 between Sanjiang (Guangxi) and Guiyang, the provincial capital. A large bridge spans the river and connects the city's two halves.

Languages
In Congjiang County, Miao consists of the following three dialects (Congjiang County Gazetteer 1999:129).
Dialectal area 2: Zaibian, Xishan (similar to Rongshui Miao)
Dialectal area 3: Xiajiang, Tingdong, Kongming

Communities
The county seat is known as Congjiang.

The community of Biasha or Basha is within the county. The population are Miao people, and the residents are allowed under the Chinese government to possess and use firearms as this is their cultural heritage. Demonstrations of gun marksmanship and other activities serve as tourist attractions. Katia Andreassi of National Geographic described it as "one of the most visited towns in the area".

Climate

References

External links

 
Cities in Guizhou
Counties of Qiandongnan Prefecture